[[Image:Maison de Verre.JPG|thumb|right|266px|Maison de Verres umbrella stand (at the entry) typical of the hand-crafted machine looking interior]]

The Maison de Verre (French for House of Glass''') was built from 1928 to 1932 in Paris, France.  Constructed in the early modern style of architecture, the house's design emphasized three primary traits: honesty of materials, variable transparency of forms, and juxtaposition of "industrial" materials and fixtures with a more traditional style of home décor.  The primary materials used were steel, glass, and glass block. Some of the notable "industrial" elements included rubberized floor tiles, bare steel beams, perforated metal sheet, heavy industrial light fixtures, and mechanical fixtures.

The design was a collaboration among Pierre Chareau (a furniture and interiors designer), Bernard Bijvoet (a Dutch architect working in Paris since 1927) and Louis Dalbet (craftsman metalworker). Much of the intricate moving scenery of the house was designed on site as the project developed. The historian Henry-Russel Hitchcock as well as the designer Eileen Gray have declared that the architect was in fact 'that clever Dutch engineer (Bijvoet)'(Gray). The external form is defined by translucent glass block walls, with select areas of clear glazing for transparency. Internally, spatial division is variable by the use of sliding, folding or rotating screens in glass, sheet or perforated metal, or in combination. Other mechanical components included an overhead trolley from the kitchen to dining room, a retracting stair from the private sitting room to Mme Dalsace's bedroom and complex bathroom cupboards and fittings.

The program of the home was somewhat unusual in that it included a ground-floor medical suite for Dr. Jean Dalsace.  This variable circulation pattern was provided for by a rotating screen that hid the private stairs from patients during the day but framed the stairs at night.

The house is notable for its splendid architecture, but it may be more well known for another reason. It was built on the site of a much older building that the patron had purchased and intended to demolish.  Much to his or her chagrin, however, the elderly tenant on the top floor of the building absolutely refused to sell, and so the patron was obliged to completely demolish the bottom three floors of the building and construct the Maison de Verre underneath, all without disturbing the original top floor.

Dr. Dalsace was a member of the French Communist Party who played a significant role in both anti-fascist and cultural affairs. In the mid-1930s, the Maison de Verre's double-height "salle de séjour" was transformed into a salon regularly frequented by Marxist intellectuals like Walter Benjamin as well as by Surrealist poets and artists such as Louis Aragon, Paul Éluard, Pablo Picasso, Max Ernst, Jacques Lipchitz, Jean Cocteau, Yves Tanguy, Joan Miró and Max Jacob. According to the American art historian Maria Gough, the Maison de Verre had a powerful influence on Walter Benjamin, especially on his constructivist - rather than expressionist - reading of Paul Scheerbart's utopian project for a future "culture of glass", for a "new glass environment [which] will completely transform mankind," as the latter expressed it in his 1914 treatise Glass Architecture. See in particular Benjamin's 1933 essay Erfahrung und Armut'' ("Experience and Poverty").

American architectural historian Robert Rubin bought the house from Dalsace family in 2006 to restore it and use it for his family residence. He allows a limited number of tours to the house.

Notes

References

External links

Michael Carapetian, 100 x Maison de verre, Brinkmann und Bose, Berlin 2016, 
 Nicolai Ouroussoff's article in The New York Times, "The Best House in Paris", 26 August 2007
 Article: "A Serious Point of Departure" - La Maison de la Rue St. Guillaume
 "Paris’s Luminous Secret" WSJ Article, 18 July 2009
 Video tour of Maison de Verre

 Maison de Verre

Buildings and structures in the 7th arrondissement of Paris
Houses in Paris
Modernist architecture in France
Buildings and structures completed in 1932